The 46th Indian Infantry Brigade was an Infantry formation of the Indian Army during World War II. The brigade was formed in June 1941, at Ahmednagar in India and assigned to the 17th Indian Infantry Division. In February 1942, during the Japanese conquest of Burma the Brigade suffered heavy casualties during the retreat to the Sittang River and was dispersed into small groups after the Battle of Sittang Bridge. The Brigade was never reformed and officially disbanded 25 February 1942.

Formation
3rd Battalion, 7th Gurkha Rifles
7th Battalion, 10th Baluch Regiment
5th Battalion, 17th Dogra Regiment

Also attached in February 1942
4th Battalion, Burma Rifles
2nd Battalion, King's Own Yorkshire Light Infantry
2nd Battalion, Duke of Wellington's Regiment

See also

 List of Indian Army Brigades in World War II

References

British Indian Army brigades
Military units and formations in Burma in World War II